Mount Graham High School (MGHS) is an alternative high school located in Safford, Arizona. It is part of the Safford Unified School District. It offers flexible schedules and childcare services for students with children. The school's mascot is the wolverine.

Facilities

The school has a childcare facility, a kitchen for culinary teaching and cooking, and one main (big) classroom followed with a science classroom and a quiet classroom.

References

External links
 Mount Graham High School
 High School Maps – Mt. Graham High School

See also
 Alternative school
 High school
 Safford Unified School District

Public high schools in Arizona
Educational institutions established in 1994
Education in Safford, Arizona
Schools in Graham County, Arizona
Alternative schools in the United States
1994 establishments in Arizona